Ophiolechia is a genus of moths in the family Gelechiidae.

Species
 Ophiolechia acuta Sattler, 1996
 Ophiolechia allomorpha Sattler, 1996
 Ophiolechia arida Sattler, 1996
 Ophiolechia contrasta Sattler, 1996 (Type species)
 Ophiolechia crassipennis Sattler, 1996
 Ophiolechia divisa Sattler, 1996
 Ophiolechia marginata Sattler, 1996
 Ophiolechia ophiomima Sattler, 1996
 Ophiolechia ophiomorpha (Meyrick, 1935)
 Ophiolechia pertinens (Meyrick, 1931)
 Ophiolechia semiochrea Sattler, 1996
 Ophiolechia spinifera Sattler, 1996
 Ophiolechia stulta Sattler, 1996
 Ophiolechia triangula Sattler, 1996

References

 
Gelechiinae